SGS/SCN are Australian regional television stations serving the Spencer Gulf of South Australia and the Broken Hill area of New South Wales, owned by Southern Cross Austereo. The station is based in Port Pirie, South Australia with satellite offices in Broken Hill, Port Augusta, Whyalla and Port Lincoln, and studio and playout facilities based in Canberra.

Prior to 2004, GTS/BKN were the only regional commercial stations servicing the Spencer Gulf and Broken Hill areas. They broadcast a selection of content, 'cherry-picked' from the three metropolitan networks Seven, Nine and Ten. GTS/BKN remained among the few stations that continued to 'cherry-pick' content following aggregation in the 1980s, though after 2000 it began to favour content from Seven due to its ownership by Seven affiliate Southern Cross Television. In 2003, Spencer Gulf Telecasters won the right to broadcast a second station in the same licence area, and in January 2004, SGS/SCN were launched as a Ten-affiliated station, branded as 10.

On 11 January 2011, SGS/SCN launched 10's SD multichannel Eleven, which was rebranded as 10 Peach in 2018.

Programming
SGS/SCN, as part of Ten, is the area's Network 10 partner network with the national programming from TEN Sydney and the local 10 News First broadcast from ADS Adelaide being aired.

News
As GTS/BKN provides the main Nightly News bulletin for South Australia, SGS/SCN does not have a local news bulletin. Instead it rebroadcasts the 10 News First bulletins from Adelaide.

Channels

See also
 Seven (Southern Cross Austereo)
 Southern Cross 10

References

External links
Official site

Southern Cross Media Group
Television stations in New South Wales
Television stations in South Australia